Ancoats and Beswick is an electoral ward of Manchester, England created by the Local Government Boundary Commission for England (LGBCE) replacing the previous electoral wards of Ancoats & Clayton and Bradford for the local elections 2018.

It is represented in Westminster by Lucy Powell MP for Manchester Central. The first councillors for the ward were elected at the 2018 local elections.

Councillors 
The current councillors for the ward are Majid Dar (Labour) and Irene Robinson (Labour), and Alan Good (Liberal Democrats).

On 24 July 2019 it was reported that Majid Dar had been suspended by the Labour party. He was readmitted to the party and to the Labour group on the council shortly after.

 indicates seat up for re-election.
 indicates seat won in by-election.

Elections in 2020s 
* denotes incumbent councillor seeking re-election.

May 2022

February 2022

May 2021

Elections in 2010s

May 2019

May 2018

References



Manchester City Council Wards